Chapter Arts Centre (often just referred to as Chapter) is an arts centre in Canton, Cardiff, Wales, opened in 1971.

Description
Chapter hosts films, plays, performance art and live music, and includes a free art gallery, café and bars. There are also over 60 work spaces, used for an eclectic range of purposes including Chapter's own training courses.

Twenty percent of the centre's income comes from the film theatres. It shows mainstream Hollywood films as well as a considerable array of foreign and independent films on a regular basis.

The centre receives a major annual grant from the Arts Council for Wales.

Spaces
Gallery spaces
Two film theatres (capacities: 188 and 57)
Two theatres (capacities: 96 and 60 seated, also standing)
Two bars (ground floor has normal opening hours; upstairs is open for specific events)
Café
Shop
Several spaces for hire (varying sizes)
Many spaces for ongoing art production, resident artists, etc.

History

Chapter was founded by Welsh artists, Christine Kinsey and Bryan Jones with journalist Mike Flood and opened in 1971. The building was previously a school, Canton High School, and was built in 1905.

21st century
In the 2000s Chapter underwent a £3.8 million redevelopment, designed by architects Ash Sakula Architects, who were appointed in 2006. The practice prioritised remodelling of the public areas on the ground floor, while adding a storey-high 'light box' above the main entrance as an 'artistic billboard'. The centre remained open through the redevelopment and the new Chapter opened in November 2009. The building won a R.I.B.A. Wales Award in 2010. The new open-plan design was described as user friendly with many great details.

Following the Centre's refurbishment in 2009, the number of visitors doubled to 800,000 per year, making it the second most popular attraction in Cardiff.

As of March 2014 Chapter installed 60 photovoltaic solar panels to their roof providing up to 15KW of electricity. 

In the autumn of 2014 Chapter became a venue for the international Artes Mundi exhibition and art prize, which expanded for the first time beyond the National Museum Cardiff.

In December 2015 Chapter renamed the main Theatre and Stiwdio spaces as Theatr Seligman Theatre and Stiwdio Seligman, following a significant donation from local benefactor David Seligman.

See also
List of cultural venues in Cardiff

References

External links

Chapter Arts Centre official site

Theatres in Cardiff
Cinemas in Wales
Arts centres in Cardiff
Performing arts centres in Wales
Canton, Cardiff
1971 establishments in Wales
Arts organizations established in 1971
Contemporary art galleries in Wales